The 2022–23 Iraqi Premier League is the 49th season of the Iraqi Premier League, the highest tier football league in Iraq, since its establishment in 1974. It is contested by 20 teams and will host 380 matches. The season started on 9 October 2022 and will end in July 2023.

Below are all of the fixtures for the 2022–23 Iraqi Premier League season.

Matchweek 1
Matchday 1 fixtures took place on 9–10 October 2022.

Matchweek 2
Matchweek 2 fixtures took place on 14–15 October 2022.

Matchweek 3
Matchweek 3 fixtures will take place on 19–20 October 2022.

Matchweek 4

Matchweek 4 fixtures will take place on 24–25 October 2022.

Matchweek 5

Matchweek 5 fixtures will take place on 29–30 October 2022.

Matchweek 6

Matchweek 6 fixtures took place on 24–25 November 2022.

Matchweek 7
Matchweek 7 fixtures took place on 29–30 November 2022.

Matchweek 8

Matchweek 8 fixtures took place on 4–5 December 2022.

Matchweek 9
Matchweek 9 fixtures took place on 9–10 December 2022.

Matchweek 10
Matchweek 10 fixtures took place on 14–15 December.

Matchweek 11
Matchweek 11 fixtures will take place on 19–20 December 2022.

Matchweek 12
Matchweek 12 fixtures took place on 24–25 December 2022.

Matchweek 13
Matchweek 13 fixtures took place between 26-28 January 2023.

Matchweek 14
Matchweek 14 fixtures took place between 31 January-2 February 2023.

Matchweek 15
Matchweek 15 fixtures took place between 5-7 February 2023.

Matchweek 16
Matchweek 16 took place between 10-11 February 2023.

Matchweek 17
Matchweek 17 took place between 18-19 February 2023.

Matchweek 18
Matchweek 18 took place between 23-24 February 2023.

Matchweek 19
Matchweek 19 fixtures took place between 28 February-1 March 2023

Matchweek 20
Matchweek 20 fixtures take place on 11-13 March 2022.

Season statistics

Top scorers

Hat-tricks

See also
 2022–23 Iraqi Premier League
 Iraqi Premier League
 Iraqi football league system
 Football in Iraq

References

External links 
Official website 
Iraq Football Association

1